The Olympus Zuiko Digital 11-22mm 1:2.8-3.5 is an interchangeable wide angle zoom lens for the Four Thirds system. It was announced by Olympus Corporation on June 24, 2003.

In its review of the lens, LensTip noted the lens' qualities at the image centre, low vignetting and low distortion particularly in the middle of the focal range, but also its "average picture quality" at the edge of the frame when shooting wide open, as well as "high chromatic aberration at the shortest focal length".

References

External links
 

Camera lenses introduced in 2003
011-022mm 1:2.8-3.5